Sofia Shinas (born January 17, 1968) is a Greek Canadian singer, songwriter, actress and director.

Shinas entered the entertainment industry as a recording artist and later pursued acting. After graduating from film school, she became a film director. She is best known for her role as Eric Draven's murdered fiancée, Shelly, in The Crow starring opposite Brandon Lee.

Career

Recording artist
In 1992, Shinas released her eponymously titled debut album on Warner Bros. Records. She co-wrote every song and worked with various producers and remixers, including Steve Peck, Daniel Abraham (record producer), Mitch Kaplan, Mark 'MK' Kinchen, Roger Sanchez, Tommy Musto, Ben Grosse and Boris Granich.

Her first single, "The Message", reached No. 20 on Billboard's Dance/Club Play chart and was a crossover pop hit, peaking at No. 75 on the Hot 100 chart. Her second single, "One Last Kiss", didn't chart in the US, but became a minor hit in her native Canada. Her last single, "State of Mind", peaked at No. 16 on the Dance/Club Play chart. She received a Juno Award nomination for Most Promising Female Vocalist at the Juno Awards of 1993.

Shinas left the music business to pursue a career as actor and director. She has not released another album.

Film actress
Shinas made her film debut in the 1994 action thriller The Crow, starring Brandon Lee. The box office hit has become a cult favorite. Shinas then landed a role opposite Charlie Sheen and Nastassja Kinski in Terminal Velocity.

She starred alongside C. Thomas Howell in the independent action/drama, Hourglass and in the 1997 action film, Dilemma.

Television actress
Shinas appeared in two episodes of the TV series The Outer Limits (in the "Valerie 23" and "Mary 25" episodes) and an episode of The Hunger.

Film director
Shinas's first feature as director was the thriller, My Stepdaughter, released in August 2015.

Education
In 2008, Shinas graduated from the USC School of Cinema-Television in Los Angeles, California where she directed a film titled Spring Eternal as a thesis project.

Personal life
Fluent in English, Hebrew, and Greek, the director often travels between her Hollywood home and her Canadian hometown.

Shinas is an avid supporter of welfare and conservation organizations dedicated to helping endangered species. She is particularly interested in big cats and has worked with tigers in human care.

Filmography

Discography

Albums
1992: Sofia Shinas

Singles
1992: "The Message"
1992: "One Last Kiss"
1992: "State of Mind (You Make Me Feel Good)"

References

External links
 
 
 

1968 births
Living people
Musicians from Windsor, Ontario
Canadian dance musicians
Actresses from Windsor, Ontario
Canadian television actresses
Canadian film actresses
USC School of Cinematic Arts alumni
Canadian people of Greek descent
Film directors from Ontario
Canadian women film directors
Warner Records artists
21st-century Canadian women singers